Greenock and Inverclyde may mean or refer to:

 Greenock and Inverclyde (UK Parliament constituency)
 Greenock and Inverclyde (Scottish Parliament constituency)